Jayawardane Ratnayake Arachchige Prabath Nissanka (born October 25, 1980), or Prabath Nissanka, is a former Sri Lankan cricketer, who played in Test matches and One Day Internationals for the Sri Lanka national cricket team. He is a right-handed batsman and a right-arm medium-fast bowler.

He hailed from St. Thomas College, Matara and one of the quickest bowlers produced by Sri Lanka.

Domestic career
He had an impressive debut in Sharjah in October 2001, picking up two wickets in the process. Nissanka also played List A cricket between 1998 and 2003. He is a member of the MRF Foundation for pace bowlers.

International career

Nissanka was a part of Sri Lanka's ICC Cricket World Cup squad in 2003 and his 4/12 helped Sri Lanka to restrict Canada to 36 runs which is a World Cup record.

In Nissanka's last match, he took 5/64 against West Indies. Nissanka is prone to suffering from various ailments on his knees and had to undergo surgery after his last match. Doctors have said that the probability of him playing competitive cricket ever in his life again is minimum.

After cricket
After playing competitive cricket, he was the strength and conditioning coach for the under-19 Sri Lankan National Team. He qualified as a level 3 high performance coach and became the assistant national bowling coach for Sri Lanka Cricket. He resigned from Sri Lanka Cricket in 2013 and moved to Australia to complete Level 3 and 4 in fitness. He is currently working as a cricket coach and a personal fitness trainer.

References

1980 births
Living people
Sri Lanka One Day International cricketers
Sri Lanka Test cricketers
Sri Lankan cricketers
Matara Sports Club cricketers
Bloomfield Cricket and Athletic Club cricketers
Saracens Sports Club cricketers